Rangel Abushev (born 26 May 1989) is a Bulgarian footballer who plays as a forward.

Career
In September 2016, Abushev joined Spartak Pleven but due to registration problems following contract disputes with his former club Sibir Novosibirsk he was unable to play.  He signed officially on 21 February 2017. In August 2021 Abushev joined Dobrudzha Dobrich.

References

External links
 
 

1989 births
Living people
Footballers from Plovdiv
Bulgarian footballers
FC Maritsa Plovdiv players
OFC Vihren Sandanski players
PFC Lokomotiv Plovdiv players
PFC Beroe Stara Zagora players
PFC CSKA Sofia players
PFC Slavia Sofia players
Enosis Neon Paralimni FC players
PFC Marek Dupnitsa players
FC Sibir Novosibirsk players
PFC Spartak Pleven players
PFC Minyor Pernik players
FC Botev Galabovo players
PFC Spartak Varna players
First Professional Football League (Bulgaria) players
Cypriot Second Division players
Second Professional Football League (Bulgaria) players
Bulgarian expatriate footballers
Bulgarian expatriate sportspeople in Cyprus
Bulgarian expatriate sportspeople in Russia
Bulgarian expatriate sportspeople in Greece
Expatriate footballers in Cyprus
Expatriate footballers in Russia
Expatriate footballers in Greece
Association football forwards